The Little Bear Fire wildfire in New Mexico burned 44,330 acres and 254 buildings, making it the most destructive of human structures wildfire in the state's history. The previously most destructive fire was the Cerro Grande Fire. The fire began on June 4, 2012 from a lightning strike and quickly grew out of control due to dry, windy conditions. The Little Bear Fire was contained by July 30, 2012 according to Federal Emergency Management Agency.

There was no loss of human life as all but one couple in the evacuation zone said they received at least one call to evacuate the area. The New Mexico government did an effective job of notifying the public about the fire and it mitigated damages.

References

External links

2012 wildfires in the United States
2012 in New Mexico
Wildfires in New Mexico